Linda Murray-Dragan (born September 18, 1952) is an American sprint canoer who competed in the early 1970s.  She was born in Washington, D.C. and attended Oxon Hill High School in Maryland. She graduated from the University of Maryland in 1976. She was eliminated in the semifinals of the K-2 500 m event at the 1972 Summer Olympics in Munich. Four years later in Montreal, Murray-Dragan was also eliminated in the semifinals of the K-2 500 m event.

References

Sports-reference.com profile

1952 births
American female canoeists
Canoeists at the 1972 Summer Olympics
Canoeists at the 1976 Summer Olympics
Living people
Olympic canoeists of the United States
People from Washington, D.C.
University of Maryland, College Park alumni
21st-century American women